Avanti West Coast is a train operating company in the United Kingdom owned by FirstGroup (70%) and Trenitalia (30%) that operates the West Coast Partnership.

During November 2016, the Department for Transport (DfT) announced the InterCity West Coast franchise would be replaced by the West Coast Partnership (WCP). In August 2019, the DfT awarded the WCP franchise to the First Trenitalia consortium. On 8 December 2019, Avanti West Coast took over operations from the prior operating company Virgin Trains, which had run the franchise since 1997. Originally, the franchise was initially scheduled to run until March 2030, and had also been set to operate the initial High Speed 2 services from 2026. However, during December 2020, it was announced that First Trenitalia and the DfT had agreed to terminate the WCP franchise at the earlier date of 31 March 2026 as part of the abolition of the franchise system. Since then a number of contract changes have taken place due to COVID-19 and then poor performance by the company. , the company's contract will expire in October 2023. 

Avanti West Coast provide the principal long-distance passenger services on the West Coast Main Line between London, the West Midlands, North West England, North Wales and Scotland. Its services connect six of the largest cities in the UK: London, Birmingham, Liverpool, Manchester, Glasgow, and Edinburgh, which have a combined metropolitan population of over 18 million. At the start of the franchise, the rolling stock used for these services consisted of 56 Class 390 Pendolino high speed electric multiple units and 18 Class 221 Super Voyager diesel-electric multiple units; in 2019, it was announced that the Super Voyagers would be replaced by newly built Class 805 bi-mode multiple units and Class 807 electric multiple units. Originally, Avanti West Coast was set to operate the pending high speed train fleet intended for use on High Speed 2, although the contract is set to end prior to the completion of this new railway as of 2023.

History

Background
In November 2016, the Department for Transport (DfT) announced that the InterCity West Coast franchise would be superseded by the West Coast Partnership (WCP). The principal change of the WCP was the inclusion of the High Speed 2 (HS2) services, then envisioned to start around 2026. Accordingly, the DfT required that bidders have experience in operating high-speed trains and the associated infrastructure, which led to all tendering parties either being, or partnering with, an existing high-speed operator.

During June 2017, the DfT announced that three consortia had been shortlisted to bid for the franchise:

 FirstGroup (70%) / Trenitalia (30%)
 MTR Corporation (75%) / Guangshen Railway Company (25%)
 Stagecoach (50%) / SNCF (30%) / Virgin Group (20%)

In December 2018, the Spanish state-owned company Renfe Operadora joined the MTR-led bid. During April 2019, it was announced that the incumbent Stagecoach-led bid had been disqualified after it had proposed significant changes to the commercial terms, specially in regards to staff pensions. Stagecoach disputed its disqualification and launched a legal challenge to have it overturned; however, on 17 June 2020, the High Court ruled against the company and that the decision had been lawful.

In August 2019, the DfT awarded the franchise to the First Trenitalia consortium with Avanti West Coast to commence operations on 8 December 2019. The Competition and Markets Authority (CMA) launched a merger inquiry into the award of the franchise following a referral from the European Commission. During December 2019, it was announced that the CMA had approved the franchise's award; concerns that limited competition on some routes could lead to higher fares and less availability of cheaper tickets were offset by the agreement of price caps to be present in some regions.

Changes and controversies 
Services were curtailed during 2020 in response to the significant decline of passenger travel during the COVID-19 pandemic. To help tackle the threat, new hygiene practices were introduced onboard Avanti services. Occasionally, services had to be cancelled at short notice due to a lack of staff. During 2022, Avanti West Coast begun ramping up service levels again, and issued public promises to restore full service to areas such as North Wales and Chester.
As part of dealing with COVID-19, the DfT produced an Emergency Measures Agreement (EMA) and then in September 2020, an Emergency Recovery Measures Agreement (ERMA), which extended Avanti West Coast's contract until 1 April 2031.

The 2020 ERMA was overriden in October 2022 with a six-month short term contract to give the company time to improve its performance. In March 2023, this contract was extended by a further six months to expire on 15 October 2023.

Avanti West Coast is amongst those operators impacted by the 2022–2023 United Kingdom railway strikes, which are the first national rail strike in the UK for three decades. Its workers are amongst those who have voted to take industrial action due a dispute over pay and working conditions. In response, the company appealed for the general public to avoid the railways for non-essential travel on the affected dates, these being 21, 23, and 25 June, as only a minimal service could be run due to the number of staff choosing not to work. On 29 June 2022, Avanti West Coast's staff voted in favour of further strikes.

Between 14 August and 18 September 2022, Avanti West Coast reduced its timetable, citing unofficial strike action from its employees. However, this allegation was disputed by Aslef, which accused the company of lying and blamed their lack of recruitment, especially of train drivers, for the problems. Trains were running at one service per hour on the majority of routes, as opposed to the three which would typically occur on the London Euston to Manchester Piccadilly route. Following these changes, Avanti West Coast was subject to public criticism; news stories emerged of numerous train cancellations, overcrowded services, delays, and expensive fares. Many commuters faced difficulties reaching their destinations on the reduced services and some travellers have been left to wait for to two days before travel for tickets to be released for sale.

The Mayor of Greater Manchester, Andy Burnham, expressed his frustration at the operator and explained his intention to ask the then Prime Minister, Boris Johnson, to strip Avanti West Coast of their franchise. During September 2022, the CEO of Avanti West Coast resigned amid the timetable controversy. In October 2022, the UK Government extended Avanti's contract for six months but stated "drastic improvements" were necessary. According to figures released by the Office of Rail and Road on 12 November 2022, Avanti West Coast had the worst record of train cancellations in the year prior to this date. The average rate in Great Britain was 3.8%, while Avanti West Coast had a cancellation rate of 8%.

Services 
Avanti West Coast currently operates the same services as Virgin Trains did on the West Coast Main Line. However, over the course of the franchise, several timetable changes are expected to be made. It was anticipated that, from December 2022, an additional 263 train services would be run every week.

Unlike services operated by London Northwestern Railway and London Overground, the Oyster contactless payment card are not valid on Avanti West Coast services between London Euston and Watford Junction, as Avanti West Coast services are pick-up only northbound and set-down only southbound at Watford Junction. In February 2021, Avanti West Coast launched smartcard ticketing as a more convenient and environmentally-friendly alternative to traditional paper tickets.

Routes 
As of December 2022, Avanti West Coast intercity routes are shown below:

Rolling stock
Avanti West Coast commenced operations having inherited the existing Super Voyager and Pendolino fleets from Virgin Trains.

Current fleet

Future fleet
All the Class 221 Super Voyager units will be replaced by 23 new trains from the Hitachi A-train family with maintenance taking place at Alstom's Oxley TRSMD depot in Wolverhampton. These trains are to be divided into thirteen Class 805 bi-mode multiple units and ten Class 807 electric multiple units. Although the units will have the same top speed, they will not tilt like the Class 390 Pendolinos nor the Class 221 "Super Voyager" units they will replace.

Avanti West Coast had planned to operate at least 54 new high speed trains for High Speed 2 services, to be built by Hitachi Rail and Alstom in the UK and expected to enter service between 2029 and 2033.

Past fleet
In June 2022, two Avanti West Coast Class 221 "Super Voyagers", units 221142 and 221143, went off lease.

Notes

References

External links

 

Ferrovie dello Stato Italiane
FirstGroup
High Speed 2
Railway companies established in 2019
Train operating companies in the United Kingdom
2019 establishments in the United Kingdom